Kintyre is located in St. Andrew Jamaica on the side of a mountain immediately east of the Hope River, Jamaica beyond Papine.  It is accessible only via a driving bridge that can be sure to have some fault whenever a hurricane or heavy rain passes over the island.

References

Neighbourhoods in Kingston, Jamaica
Populated places in Saint Andrew Parish, Jamaica